A lobster trap is a lobster pot, a trap for lobsters and spiny lobsters.

Lobster trap or lobster pot may also refer to:

Lobster trap (finance), an anti-takeover strategy
Lobster-tailed pot helmet, a cavalry helmet
Lobster Pot (restaurant), a seafood restaurant in Massachusetts, United States